Kryvbas may also refer to the FC Kryvbas Kryvyi Rih, the football team in Kryvyi Rih. See also Kryvbas (disambiguation)

Kryvbas (full name Kryvorizkyi Iron Ore Basin) is an important economic and historical region in central Ukraine around the city of Kryvyi Rih, specializing in iron ore mining and the steel industry. It is arguably the main iron ore region of Eastern Europe. Along with Donbas, Kryvbas is a major center of heavy industry in Ukraine.

Named after the city of Kryvyi Rih, the region occupies the southwestern part of the Dnipropetrovsk Oblast, as well as a small neighbouring part of the Kirovohrad Oblast in a valley of Inhulets and Saksahan rivers (both are tributaries of Dnieper). It stretches by a narrow strip (2–7 km) from north to south almost for 100 km from Zhovti Vody (Yellow Waters) to latitudes of the Kakhovka Reservoir with total area of 300 sq km.

The region has major deposits of iron ore and some other metallurgical ores. To exploit them, several large mining companies were founded there in the middle of the 20th century. Most of them are located in Kryvyi Rih. 

Kryvorizhstal (located in Kryvyi Rih) is the largest and most up-to-date steel company in the region, and in the country. It includes ore facilities and a major steel mill (the only one in the city). Other ore companies supply their raw materials to either Kryvorizhstal or steel mills outside the region.

With the exception of Kryvorizhstal, owned by Mittal Steel, the steel companies of the region are controlled by either Privat Group or SCM. These were once state-owned industries. From the 1990s until 2004, after Ukraine declared independence and worked to establish capitalism, these industries went through difficulties and scandals as they became privatized.

A major mining and processing factory was under construction in the early 21st century in the neighboring city of Dolynska (Kirovohrad Oblast). This hi-tech project is co-funded by the governments of Ukraine, Romania and Slovakia.

See also
Donets Basin

Further reading
Гірничий енциклопедичний словник, т. 3. / За ред. В. С. Білецького. — Донецьк: Східний видавничий дім, 2004. — 752 с.

References

Economy of Ukraine
Geography of Kryvyi Rih
Economy of Dnipropetrovsk Oblast
Geography of Kirovohrad Oblast
Iron mining in Ukraine